The Orlando class was a seven ship class of Royal Navy armoured cruisers completed between 1888 and 1889.

Building Programme 

On 2 December 1884, the Secretary to the Admiralty stated, "The present Board have been gradually developing, and, as I would venture to say, in an effective manner, our resources for the protection of commerce. We have followed in their footsteps by producing the  type, and we now propose to go a step further in the same direction, by laying down vessels of the Mersey class, but protected by a belt in lieu of an armoured deck. The belt will, I think, be approved by my hon. Friend who sits behind me (Sir Edward J. Reed)." These belted cruisers were the Orlando class.

The following table gives the build details and purchase cost of the members of the Orlando class.  Standard British practice at that time was for these costs to exclude armament and stores. In the table:
Machinery meant "propelling machinery".
Hull included "hydraulic machinery, gun mountings, etc."

See also 
 Infanta Maria Teresa-class cruiser: a spanish class armored cruiser inspired design by Orlando class

Notes

References  
 Brassey, T.A. (ed) The Naval Annual 1895
 Brassey, T.A. (ed) The Naval Annual 1903

External links

Cruiser classes